The Marine 4: Moving Target (also known as The Marine 4 and The Marine: Moving Target) is an American action film starring Mike "The Miz" Mizanin and Summer Rae. The film was directed by William Kaufman and it is the fourth installment in The Marine film series, and the second to include Mizanin. The film was released digitally on April 10, 2015 and released direct-to-DVD and Blu-ray on April 21, 2015.

Plot

Jake Carter (Mike Mizanin), a former U.S Marine, is now working at Hawthorne Global Security, a private security agency led by Robert Daniels (Craig Veroni). He and a few other men are waiting at the airport for the arrival of whistleblower Olivia "Liv" Tanis (Melissa Roxburgh), an IT engineer who used to work for Genesis Defense Corporation, one of the largest defense contractors of the United States. Liv's got intel on traitors inside Genesis and they've been hired by the Department of Justice to protect Liv until she takes official custody.

While they are en route for Liv's custody, their convoy is ambushed by a group of mercenaries hired by the corrupt military on Genesis, led by South African Mercenary Simon Vogel (Josh Blacker). The mercenaries manage to kill Daniels and his men except for Jake, who takes Liv and manages to escape and outrun the mercenaries by stealing their car. The duo head to the safe house.

Once there, Liv grabs Jake's gun and says that she needs Jake's keys to go to the police station. Learning that one of the convoy might be a renegade, Jake is mistrusted because she doesn't know him but Jake asserts that if she goes alone, she will be ambushed. Jake convinces her that he is a former marine. Later, Nathan Miller (Roark Critchlow) and Ethan Smith (Matthew MacCaull), members of the Department of Justice, arrive at the safe house. Ethan suddenly shoots Nathan in the head after he tells the information of Simon Vogel and the incident. Ethan turns out to be working with Vogel. He then searches for Liv while putting Jake on gunpoint. Liv escapes the house as the alarm goes off, and Ethan is distracted, causing Jake and Ethan to fight. Whilst fighting, the group of mercenaries arrive at the house. Liv and Jake manage to outrun them using a boat.

After departing from the boat, they walk beside the stream, planning the next move. Liv still mistrusts Jake, so Jake states that the rebels will not stop until they manage to kill Liv. Still not convinced, Liv hits Jake on the head with a rock, knocking Jake out. Liv runs to the highway and hitchhikes a trailer truck to go to the nearest police station. Meanwhile, Jake recovers and follows the trail left by Liv. Jake sees a passing police car, which helps him locate the police station, where Liv is heading to.

At the police station, Liv complains that rebels are trying to kill her and is taken in custody. Shortly, Jake arrives at the police station and demands where she is. The police detective, Det. Paul Redman (Paul McGillion), who's trying to verify Jake's identity turns out to be talking to Ethan on the phone without knowledge of him working with the rebels, who tells him to keep Jake and Liv, both in custody till he arrives. The officers arrest both Jake and Liv. Ethan and the rebels arrive there. He goes inside the police station first, followed by an attack by the rebels, for which he was totally unprepared for. They then proceed to engage in a gunfight with the surviving officers. Jake and Liv obtain keys to the handcuffs from a dead officer. Jake then puts her somewhere safe and joins the gunfight. The four remaining officers including Redman are killed while trying to escape. The two manage to run from them but the rebels see them escape, ensuing a chase. The duo soon lose them, yet again.

Jake and Liv spend all night staying in the woods. The next morning, Jake calls Vogel on his phone upon their arriving at the woods. A shootout begins, killing most of the rebels including their sniper Dawes (Summer Rae) thanks to the assist of some traps made by Jake. In the ensuing chaos, Ethan holds Liv captive but the latter breaks free, allowing Jake and Ethan to fight. As Ethan gains the upper hand, Liv shoots him in the head. Suddenly, Vogel shoots Jake in the shoulder, temporarily stunning him. Unbeknownst to Vogel, Liv was able to find enough signal and finishes uploading the information of the corrupt military team to a dozen of news sites. Vogel then hits her. Jake, now recovered, tackles Vogel, snaps his neck, and kills him.

A few days later, Liv states that six members of the Genesis Defense Corporation are being indicted for treason and conspiracy. Liv gives a brand new tuxedo to Jake due to Jake losing his previous one earlier. Liv kisses Jake and boards the plane nearby. Jake watches as the plane flies away.

Cast

 Mike "The Miz" Mizanin as Jake Carter
 Melissa Roxburgh as Olivia Tanis, the whistleblower 
 Josh Blacker as Simon Vogel, former South African Special Forces soldier and Mercenary Leader
 Matthew MacCaull as Ethan Smith, DOJ mole
 Summer Rae as Rachel Dawes, Vogel's accomplice 
 Paul McGillion as Det. Redman
 Roark Critchlow as Nathan Miller, DOJ official 
 Craig Veroni as Robert Daniels, team lead at Global Hawthorne Security

Production
In February 2014, The Miz announced that he would reprise his role of Jake Carter in the third sequel to The Marine and would be co-starring with Summer Rae, who became the first ever WWE Diva to appear in a WWE Studios film. Filming started in April 2014 in Squamish, British Columbia and with principal photography ending in May 2014.

Sequel
The fifth film The Marine 5: Battleground was announced with Mizanin reprising his role of Jake Carter. The cast features Mizanin's wife Maryse Ouellet, Heath Slater, Curtis Axel, Bo Dallas, and Naomi.

Home media
The Marine 4: Moving Target was only released on DVD in 2015 in the UK, and it has never been released on Blu-ray.

References

External links
 

2015 films
2015 action films
20th Century Fox direct-to-video films
American action films
Direct-to-video sequel films
2010s English-language films
Films set in British Columbia
Films set in Washington (state)
Films shot in Vancouver
Films about the United States Marine Corps
WWE Studios films
Films directed by William Kaufman
2010s American films